Endla Wetland Complex is a wetland complex in Jõgeva County, Estonia. This complex is one of the biggest wetland massive in Estonia.

The area of the complex is 25,100 ha.

Part of the complex is under protection (Endla Nature Reserve).

References

Jõgeva County
Bogs of Estonia